NRP Dão was one of five  built for the Portuguese Navy during the 1930s. She remained in service until 1960, being refitted and re-armed several times and taking place in a coup attempt in 1936.

Construction and design
On 18 January 1933, a fifth destroyer of the class was ordered from the Lisbon Shipyard, with machinery to be built by Yarrow. Portuguese Dictator António de Oliveira Salazar gave a speech to commemorate the beginning of construction, thanking the navy minister for "choosing to name this unit of our fleet after the river that crosses my town." Dão was launched on 30 July 1934 and commissioned on 5 January 1935.

The Douros were powered by two Parsons-Curtis geared steam turbines, each driving one propeller shaft using steam provided by three Yarrow boilers.

Armament was similar to contemporary Royal Navy destroyers, with a gun armament of four 4.7 in (120 mm) Vickers-Armstrong Mk G guns, and three 2-pounder Mk VIII anti-aircraft guns. Two quadruple banks of 21-inch (533 mm) torpedo tubes were carried, while two depth charge throwers and 12 depth charges constituted the ships' anti-submarine armament. Up to 20 mines could be carried. The ships complement was 147 officers and men.

History

1936 mutiny

On 9 September 1936 the crews of the aviso Afonso de Albuquerque and the Dão mutinied while anchored in Lisbon harbour. Opposed to the Salazar dictatorship's support of the Nationalists rebels against the pro-government Republicans in the Spanish Civil War, the sailors confined their officers and declared their solidarity with the Spanish Republic. As the ships were leaving the Tejo estuary they were fired upon by the batteries from the forts and both Afonso de Albuquerque and Dão received direct hits and were grounded. Some of the sailors were killed while trying to flee, but most of the sailors were arrested and sent to the penal colony of Tarrafal in Portuguese Cape Verde. After the mutiny was put down the government claimed that the sailors had prepared to sail to Spain in order to assist the Spanish Republic.

References

Citations

Sources

External links
Jane's Fighting Ships 1938, p. 398. 
Area Militar: the Afonso de Albuquerque
Image
Revista da Armada 2001

 
Ships built in Portugal
1934 ships